The 22865/22866 Lokmanya Tilak Terminus–Puri Superfast Express is Superfast Express train belonging to Indian Railways that runs between  and Lokmanya Tilak Terminus in India.

It operates as train number 22866 from Puri to Lokmanya Tilak Terminus and as train number 22865 in the reverse direction.

Coaches

22865/22866 Lokmanya Tilak Terminus–Puri Superfast Express presently has 1 1st AC, 1 AC 2 tier, 5 AC 3 tier, 9 Sleeper class, 4 General Unreserved coaches & 2 SLR with 1 pantry car.

As with most train services in India, coach composition may be amended at the discretion of Indian Railways depending on demand.

Service

22866 Puri–Lokmanya Tilak Terminus Superfast Express covers the distance of 1851 kilometres in 32 hours 05 mins (57.69 km/hr) & in 32 hours 50 mins (56.38 km/hr) as 22865 Lokmanya Tilak Terminus–Puri Superfast Express.

As the average speed of the train is above 55 km/hr, as per Indian Railways rules, its fare includes a Superfast surcharge.

It reverses direction at twice during its run at  & .

Traction

Initially, before 6 June 2015, this train was hauled by 3 locomotives during its run. A Visakhapatnam or Bondamunda-based WDM-3A would haul the train between Puri &  after which an Bhusawal-based WAP-4 or Tatanagar-based WAM-4 takes over until  handing over to a dual-traction WCAM 3 until Lokmanya Tilak Terminus.

With the completion of electrification between Sambalpur railway station to Angul railway station, it is now hauled by an Electric Loco Shed, Bhilai-based WAP-7 end to end

Time Table

22866 Puri–Lokmanya Tilak Terminus Superfast Express leaves Puri every Tuesday at 05:30 hrs IST and reaches Lokmanya Tilak Terminus at 13:35 hrs IST the next day.
22865 Lokmanya Tilak Terminus–Puri Superfast Express leaves Lokmanya Tilak Terminus every Thursday at 00:15 hrs IST and reaches Puri at 08:45 hrs IST the next day.

External links

References 

Transport in Mumbai
Express trains in India
Rail transport in Maharashtra
Rail transport in Chhattisgarh
Rail transport in Odisha
Transport in Puri